Aleksandr Kharlov (born 18 March 1958) is a retired hurdler from the Soviet Union, best known for winning the bronze medal at the inaugural 1983 World Championships in the men's 400 m hurdles.

Kharlov competed at the 1980 Summer Olympics, where he was eliminated in the semifinals of the men's 400 m hurdles. Later that summer, he won gold at the Universiade in Edmonton, running 49.41 and defeating Senegal's Amadou Dia Ba by half a second. At the inaugural World Championships in Helsinki in August 1983 Kharlov won the bronze medal in 49.03; running in lane one, Kharlov was among the tail-enders for much of the race but finished fast, edging out Sweden's Sven Nylander (who also started slow) by 0.03 seconds.

References

External links
 

1958 births
Living people
Uzbekistani male hurdlers
Soviet male hurdlers
Athletes (track and field) at the 1980 Summer Olympics
Olympic athletes of the Soviet Union
Sportspeople from Tashkent
World Athletics Championships medalists
Universiade medalists in athletics (track and field)
World Athletics Championships athletes for the Soviet Union
Universiade gold medalists for the Soviet Union
Medalists at the 1983 Summer Universiade